Fasting spittle – saliva produced first thing in the morning, before breakfast – has been used to treat a wide variety of diseases for many hundreds of years. Spittle cures are usually considered to be more effective if fasting spittle is used.

An early recorded use of spittle as a cure comes from the Gospel of St Mark, believed to have been written in about 70 AD:

Writing at about the same time as Mark, the Roman natural philosopher Pliny commented in his Natural History that fasting spittle was efficacious in the treatment of ophthalmia, and that the fasting spittle of a woman was particularly beneficial for treating bloodshot eyes.

References

Citations

Bibliography

Folklore
Alternative medicine
Saliva